Michaela Jaksch-Angerer is a German medical doctor, consultant in laboratory medicine, and Associate Professor (PD Dr. med) for Clinical Chemistry. She has held the position of "Managing and Medical Director" since 2004 at the Freiburg Medical Laboratory Middle East LLC, Dubai, UAE, a member of Synlab since 2013. FML was founded in 2002 as a joint venture of the University of Freiburg Germany and the Al Abbas Group, Dubai, UAE.

Biography 
Jaksch-Angerer studied medicine at the Ludwig Maximilians University (LMU) in Munich. After her doctoral thesis in Immunology 1993, she specialized in Laboratory Medicine (Fachaerztin, 2000). Her research strongly focused on Mitochondrial Genetics (1994-2007), with several awarded original articles out of more than 50 peer reviewed publications. She habilitated’ (PD Dr. med. habil.) in Clinical Chemistry in 2003, with the research work ‘causes of cytochrome c oxidase deficiency’ at the LMU Munich. In the same year, she was listed for the first position for the professorship of Neuro-biochemistry at the Carl Gustav Carus Technical University in Dresden, Germany. She was also elected by the Freiburg University for the position of the Managing and Medical Director at FML Dubai, UAE in 2003.

Awards 
FML was the first medical laboratory in the Middle East receiving the accreditation according to the high standard ISO 15189 from the German accreditation body DAkkS in 2008. Since 2004, FML provides special and highly sophisticated diagnostic testing in the region onsite, as well as with a network of experts and with Synlab. She is also the recipient of two research awards from DMG, Freiburg, Germany. She also contributed many books, including the Encyclopedia of Molecular Mechanisms of Disease.

Selected publications

References 

German women physicians
1961 births
Living people
German healthcare managers